Sailing at the 2014 Asian Games was held at Wangsan Sailing Marina in Incheon, South Korea from September 24 to 1 October 2014.

Schedule

Medalists

Men

Women

Open

Medal table

Participating nations
A total of 177 athletes from 20 nations competed in sailing at the 2014 Asian Games:

References

External links
Official website

 
2014
2014 Asian Games events
Asian Games
2014 Asian Games